The Mid-American Conference (MAC) is a National Collegiate Athletic Association (NCAA) Division I collegiate athletic conference with a membership base in the Great Lakes region that stretches from Western New York to Illinois. Nine of the twelve full member schools are in Ohio and Michigan, with single members located in Illinois, Indiana, and New York. For football, the MAC participates in the NCAA's Football Bowl Subdivision.

The MAC is headquartered in the Public Square district in downtown Cleveland, Ohio, and has two members in the nearby Akron area. The conference ranks highest among all ten NCAA Division I FBS conferences for graduation rates.

History

The five charter members of the Mid-American Conference were Ohio University, Butler University, the University of Cincinnati, Wayne University (now Wayne State University), and Western Reserve University, one of the predecessors to today's Case Western Reserve University. Wayne University left after the first year. Miami University and Western Michigan University took the place of those charter members for the 1948 season. The MAC added the University of Toledo (1950), Kent State University (1951), and Bowling Green State University (1952). The University of Cincinnati resigned its membership February 18, 1953, with an effective date of June 1, 1953. Cincinnati's decision was based on a new requirement that at least 5 conference football games would have to be scheduled each season, University President Raymond Walters saying they "...regretfully resign...as the university could not continue under the present setup..."

The membership was steady for the next two decades except for the addition of Marshall University in 1954 and the departure of Western Reserve in 1955. Marshall was expelled from the conference in 1969 due to NCAA violations.  The first major expansion since the 1950s took place in the mid-1970s with the addition of Central Michigan University and Eastern Michigan University in 1972 and Ball State University and Northern Illinois University in 1973.  NIU left after the 1985–86 season. The University of Akron joined the conference in 1992. The conference became the largest in Division I-A with the re-admittance of Marshall and NIU in 1997 and addition of the Bulls from the University at Buffalo in 1998. The University of Central Florida, a non-football all-sports member in the Atlantic Sun Conference at the time, joined for football only in 2002, becoming the first football-only member in conference history. Marshall and Central Florida left after the 2004–05 academic year, both joining Conference USA in all sports.

In May 2005, the Temple Owls in Philadelphia signed a six-year contract with the MAC as a football-only school and began play in the East Division in 2007.

The Louisville Cardinals were a MAC affiliate for field hockey for a number of years when Louisville was a member of the Metro Conference and Conference USA, winning two MAC tourney titles in 2003 and 2004.

The Missouri State Bears, Evansville Purple Aces, and Southern Illinois Salukis participate in the MAC for men's swimming and diving. In 2012, the West Virginia Mountaineers joined the Florida Atlantic Owls and Hartwick College Hawks as men's soccer affiliates. Florida Atlantic departed upon joining Conference USA in 2013. Hartwick's contract was not renewed by the MAC in 2015. Nine schools are wrestling affiliates; most became affiliates when the MAC absorbed the former Eastern Wrestling League in 2019. Appalachian State University and Longwood University are associates in field hockey; Missouri State had also been a member in that sport from 2005 until dropping field hockey after the 2016 season. Binghamton University is an affiliate in men's tennis. In June 2017, SIU Edwardsville (SIUE) was invited to become an affiliate member in both men's soccer and wrestling in 2018. When Buffalo suddenly dropped four sports, including men's soccer, SIUE's move in that sport was made immediately.

The UMass Minutemen joined the MAC as a football-only member in July 2012; the university announced that the team would leave the MAC at the end of the 2015 season due to contractual issues. Meanwhile, Temple ended its affiliation with the MAC in football and joined the Big East for football in July 2012. Following the split of the Big East into football-sponsoring and non-football conferences in July 2013, Temple became a full member of the football-sponsoring portion, the American Athletic Conference, ending its membership in the Atlantic 10 at that time. The Chicago State Cougars were an affiliate for men's tennis until joining the Western Athletic Conference, which sponsors that sport, in July 2013.

The conference unveiled the addition of women's lacrosse to its sport sponsorship in November 2019. Lacrosse began competing under the MAC banner with six teams in the 2021 season with MAC members Akron, Central Michigan and Kent State joined by associate members Detroit Mercy, Robert Morris, and Youngstown State. Eastern Michigan became the seventh women's lacrosse member when it added the sport in the 2022 season.

At the end of the 2022 season, the MAC discontinued men's soccer as a sponsored sport. While the conference realignment of the early 2020s did not affect the MAC's core membership, it significantly impacted the amount of men's soccer sponsoring programs within the conference, and ultimately led to the conference lacking enough teams to maintain its automatic bid to the NCAA tournament. Of the four full MAC members that sponsored men's soccer in the 2022 season, Bowling Green, Northern Illinois, and Western Michigan moved the sport to the Missouri Valley Conference, and Akron moved it to the Big East Conference. Chicago State, the conferences sole men's soccer affiliate, has yet to announce a new home for its own program.

Member schools

Current members
There are twelve public universities with full membership:

Notes

Current affiliate members
Twenty-one schools have MAC affiliate membership status. On July 1, 2012, Temple joined the Big East Conference for football only (the school's other sports would join the Big East/American for 2013–14), and Massachusetts replaced Temple as a football-only member in the MAC East Division. On September 19, 2012, the MAC announced Missouri, Northern Iowa and Old Dominion would join as wrestling affiliates; as the Southeastern and Missouri Valley Conferences do not sponsor wrestling. Missouri and Northern Iowa participated only in the conference tournament in the 2012–13 school year, and began full conference play in 2013–14. Old Dominion did not begin MAC competition until 2013–14, when it left the Colonial Athletic Association (which had sponsored wrestling, but no longer does so) for Conference USA (which has never sponsored the sport). Old Dominion discontinued wrestling in April 2020.

On July 1, 2013, Florida Atlantic's men's soccer program moved with the rest of its athletic program to Conference USA, and Chicago State's men's tennis team followed the rest of its sports to the Western Athletic Conference.

The 2014–15 school year saw one affiliate member leave for another conference and two new affiliates join. The Hartwick men's soccer team left the MAC for the Sun Belt Conference, which had announced in February 2014 that it would reinstate men's soccer, a sport that it last sponsored in 1995, for the 2014 season. The new affiliates for 2014–15 were Binghamton in men's tennis and Longwood in field hockey.

On July 1, 2017, one associate member left the MAC, another associate member dropped one of its two MAC sports, and two new schools became associate members. Northern Iowa wrestling moved from the MAC to the Big 12 Conference. Missouri State dropped field hockey, but remained a MAC member in men's swimming & diving. Appalachian State joined MAC field hockey, and SIU Edwardsville (SIUE) joined in men's soccer. SIUE was initially announced as joining in both men's soccer and wrestling in 2018, but less than a week after the initial announcement, the conference indicated that SIUE men's soccer would immediately join. SIUE wrestling joined on its originally announced schedule.

On March 5, 2019, the conference announced that it would be adding the seven former members of the Eastern Wrestling League as affiliate members in wrestling, making the MAC the second largest wrestling conference for academic year 2019-2020.

With the addition of women's lacrosse, the MAC added affiliate members Detroit Mercy, Robert Morris, and Youngstown State in the 2020–21 academic year. UDM and YSU, all-sports members of the Horizon League, were announced as incoming associates at the same time the MAC announced the addition of lacrosse. RMU was announced as an incoming associate in late June 2020, shortly after the school announced it would join the Horizon League in July 2020.

In June 2020, SIUE announced that it would leave the MAC men's soccer league in 2021 to rejoin its previous men's soccer home of the Missouri Valley Conference. It remains in MAC wrestling to this day.

Also in 2021, Missouri left MAC wrestling and returned to its former home of the Big 12 Conference as a wrestling-only member. At the same time, four schools became single-sport MAC members—Bellarmine in field hockey, Georgia Southern and Georgia State in men's soccer, and Valparaiso in men's swimming (the school does not include diving in its men's aquatics program).

In 2022, West Virginia men's soccer was scheduled to leave the MAC for single-sport membership in Conference USA. However, due to the tenuous future of C-USA at that time, West Virginia opted instead to join the Sun Belt Conference (SBC) in 2022 as that league reinstated men's soccer. Georgia Southern and Georgia State, both full SBC members, also returned men's soccer to their home conference in 2022. In response, the MAC announced that Chicago State would join as a men's soccer affiliate as of the 2022–23 season, as the Cougars prepared to depart the Western Athletic Conference in all sports, including soccer. Also in 2022, the MAC gained another affiliate when another Chicago institution, UIC, joined for men's swimming & diving. Ultimately, Chicago State's tenure as a MAC affiliate lasted only for the 2022 season, as the conference dropped men's soccer at season's end.

{| class="wikitable sortable" style="text-align: center;"
|-
!Institution
!Location
!Founded
!Joined
!Type
!Enrollment
!Nickname
!class="unsortable" | Colors
!MACsport
!Primaryconference
|-
| Appalachian State University
| Boone, North Carolina
| 1899
| 2017–18
| Public
| 19,089
| Mountaineers
| 
| rowspan=2 | field hockey
| Sun Belt
|-
| Bellarmine University
| Louisville, Kentucky
| 1950
| 2021–22
| Private (Catholic)
| 3,973
| Knights
| 
| ASUN
|-
| Binghamton University
| Vestal, New York
| 1946
| 2014–15
| rowspan=4 | Public
| 16,098
| Bearcats
| 
| tennis (m)
| America East
|-
| Bloomsburg University of Pennsylvania
| Bloomsburg, Pennsylvania
| 1839
| 2019–20
| 9,950
| Huskies
| 
| wrestling
| PSAC(Division II)
|-bgcolor=pink
|Chicago State University
| Chicago, Illinois
| 1867
| 2022-23
| 2,620
| Cougars
| 
| soccer (m)
| Independent
|-
| Cleveland State University| Cleveland, Ohio
| 1964
| 2019–20
| 17,260
| Vikings
| 
| wrestling
| rowspan="2"|Horizon
|-
| | Detroit, Michigan
| 1877
| 2020–21
| Private (Catholic)
| 5,700
| Titans
| 
| lacrosse (w)
|-
| 
| Evansville, Indiana
| 1854
| 2009–10
| Private (Methodist)
| 3,050
| Purple Aces
| 
| swimming & diving (m)
| Missouri Valley
|-
| George Mason University| Fairfax, Virginia
| 1957
| 2019–20
| rowspan=6 | Public
| 35,047
| Patriots
| 
| wrestling
| Atlantic 10
|-
| Lock Haven University of Pennsylvania| Lock Haven, Pennsylvania
| 1870
| 2019–20
| 4,607
| Bald Eagles
| 
| wrestling
| PSAC(Division II)
|-
| Longwood University| Farmville, Virginia
| 1839
| 2014–15
| 4,800
| Lancers
| 
| field hockey
| Big South
|-
| Missouri State University| Springfield, Missouri
| 1905
| 2009–10
| 21,425
| Bears
| 
| swimming & diving (m)
| Missouri Valley
|-
|  (Clarion)
| Clarion, Pennsylvania
| 1867
| rowspan=3 |2019–20
| 5,225
| Golden Eagles
| 
| wrestling
| PSAC(Division II)
|-
|  (Edinboro)
| Edinboro, Pennsylvania
| 1857
| 4,834
| Fighting Scots
| 
| wrestling
| PSAC(Division II)
|-
| Rider University| Lawrenceville, New Jersey
| 1865
| rowspan=2 | Private (nonsectarian)
| 5,400
| Broncs
| 
| wrestling
| MAAC
|-
| Robert Morris University| Moon Township, Pennsylvania
| 1921
| 2020–21
| 4,895
| Colonials
| 
| lacrosse (w)
| Horizon
|-
| Southern Illinois University Carbondale| Carbondale, Illinois
| 1869
| 2009–10
| rowspan=3 | Public
| 17,964
| Salukis
| 
| swimming & diving (m)
| Missouri Valley
|-
| Southern Illinois University Edwardsville| Edwardsville, Illinois
| 1957
| 2018–19
| 14,142
| Cougars
| 
| wrestling
| OVC
|-
|  (UIC)
| Chicago, Illinois
| 1859
| 2022-23
| 34,199
| Flames
| 
| swimming & diving (m)
| Missouri Valley
|-
| Valparaiso University| Valparaiso, Indiana
| 1859
| 2021-22
| Private
| 4,500
| Beacons
| 
| swimming (m)
| Missouri Valley
|-
| Youngstown State University| Youngstown, Ohio
| 1908
| 2020–21
| Public
| 15,058
| Penguins
| 
| lacrosse (w)
| Horizon
|}

Former members
School names, nicknames, and colors listed here reflect those used during each school's MAC tenure.

Notes

Former affiliate members
School names, nicknames, and colors listed here reflect those used during each school's MAC tenure.

Notes

Membership timeline

  

Academics
One of the current full member schools, the University at Buffalo, is a member of the Association of American Universities (AAU). All members of the MAC are classified among "R2: Doctoral Universities – High research activity" except for the University at Buffalo, Kent State University, and Ohio University, which are classified among "R1: Doctoral Universities – Very high research activity". Member schools are also ranked nationally and globally by various groups, including U.S. News & World Report and Times Higher Education.

Sports
The Mid-American Conference sponsors championship competition in 11 men's and 13 women's NCAA sanctioned sports, with women's lacrosse becoming the newest sport in 2020–21. As of the 2022–23 school year, 20 schools are associate members for six sports.

As the MAC is an FBS conference, its full members are subject to the NCAA requirement that FBS members field teams in at least 16 NCAA-recognized sports. However, the MAC itself requires sponsorship of only four sports: football, men's and women's basketball, and women's volleyball.

Men's sponsored sports by school

Men's varsity sports not sponsored by the MAC

Notes

Women's sponsored sports by school

Women's varsity sports not sponsored by the MAC

Notes:

Football
All-time results
  For the most recent season, see 2022 Mid-American Conference football season.

 - Buffalo invited to Tangerine Bowl in 1958 / Declined due to Florida's segregation laws at the time which would not have allowed Buffalo's two black players to participate.

MAC championsBowl gamesIn 2017, the MAC is contracted to provide a team for each of the four college football bowl games: the Bahamas Bowl, LendingTree Bowl, Famous Idaho Potato Bowl, and Camellia Bowl. The MAC also has secondary agreements with the Quick Lane Bowl and with several ESPN owned bowls.

Notes
 The MAC Champion (if not invited to the College Football Playoff or its associated bowls) is not contractually obligated to any specific bowl. The conference and the universities select which teams will play in which of the league's affiliated bowls.

College Football Playoff
The MAC champion receives an automatic berth in one of the so-called "New Year's Six" bowl games associated with the College Football Playoff under either of the following circumstances:
 Selected as one of the top four teams overall by the CFP selection committee, in which case the team will play in a CFP national semifinal.
 Ranked by the committee as the top champion among the five conferences (American, C-USA, MAC, MW, Sun Belt) given access to one of the CFP bowls, in which case the team will play in the so-called "Access Bowl" as an at-large selection.

The first "Access Bowl" berth in 2014 went to Boise State (MW); the 2015 berth went to Houston (American). The MAC got its first berth in 2016 with Western Michigan, who had an undefeated regular season that year and finished ranked at No. 15 in the AP Poll.

During the era of the now-defunct Bowl Championship Series (BCS), one MAC team appeared in a BCS bowl game. In 2012, NIU qualified by being ranked in the top 16 (15th) in the season's final BCS standings, and also higher than at least one champion of a conference that received an automatic berth in a BCS game. In the 2012 season, two such conference champions were ranked below NIU: Big East champion Louisville, who was ranked 22nd, and Big Ten champion Wisconsin, who was unranked. NIU lost to Florida State in the Orange Bowl.

Rivalries
Football rivalries involving MAC teams include:

In addition, Central Michigan, Eastern Michigan, and Western Michigan compete for the Michigan MAC Trophy, which is awarded to the team with the best head-to-head record each year. Since the inception of the trophy in 2005, Western Michigan has won 7 times, Central Michigan has won 5 times, and Eastern Michigan has won the trophy 4 times. Western Michigan has won the trophy the past three years (2018-2020) as well as 6 of the past 7 years (2014, 2015, 2016, 2018, 2019, and 2020).

Basketball

In August 2010, Commissioner Jon Steinbrecher and the Cleveland Cavaliers announced that the Mid-American Conference men's and women's basketball tournaments would remain in Cleveland at the venue then known as Quicken Loans Arena and now as Rocket Mortgage FieldHouse through 2017. Both tournaments have flourished since moving to Cleveland in 2000, with the men's semi-finals and championship regularly drawing large crowds at Quicken Loans Arena. In 2007, the MAC also announced a format change for both tournaments, bringing all twelve men's and women's teams to Cleveland. The MAC also co-hosted the 2007 Women's Final Four at Quicken Loans Arena after successfully hosting the 2006 NCAA Women's Basketball Regional at the same facility.

On May 12, 2020, Steinbrecher announced a suite of major changes to the conference's competitive format across multiple sports in response to fallout from the COVID-19 pandemic. Specific to men's and women's basketball, the following changes took effect in 2020–21 and will continue through at least 2023–24:
 The conference adopted a single league table, eliminating the divisional standings.
 The conference schedule increased from 18 to 20 games.
 Only the top eight men's and women's teams advance to their respective conference tournaments.

Championships

Current MAC champions
The following are the most recent conference champions of each MAC sport. Champions from the previous academic year are indicated with the calendar year of their title.

In sports in which regular-season and tournament champions are recognized, "RS" indicates regular-season champion and "T" indicates tournament champion.Fall 2022Winter 2022–23Spring 2022Facilities

Hall of Fame
The Mid-American Conference Hall of Fame was the first Division I conference Hall of Fame. It was established in 1987 and classes have been inducted in 1988, 1989, 1990, 1991, 1992, 1994, 2012 and 2013.

In order to be eligible, a person must have participated during the time the university was in the MAC and five years must have passed from the time the individual participated in athletics or worked in the athletic department.

The following is a list of the members of the MAC Hall of Fame, along with school affiliation, sport(s) for which they were inducted, and year of induction.

 Harold Anderson, Bowling Green, basketball, 1991
 Janet Bachna, Kent State, gymnastics, 1992
 Joe Begala, Kent State, wrestling, 1991
 Tom Beutler, Toledo, football, 1994
 Kermit Blosser, Ohio, golf, 1988
 Jim Corrigall, Kent State, football, 1994
 Hasely Crawford, Eastern Michigan, track and field, 1991
 Ben Curtis, Kent State, golf, 2012
 Caroline (Mast) Daugherty, Ohio, basketball, 1994
 Herb Deromedi, Central Michigan, football, 2012
 Chuck Ealey, Toledo, football, 1988
 Fran Ebert, Western Michigan, softball / basketball, 1992
 Wayne Embry, Miami, basketball, 2012
 Karen Fitzpatrick, Ball State, field hockey, 2012
 John Gill, WMU athlete / coach / administrator, 1994
 Maurice Harvey, Ball State, football, 1992
 Bill Hess, Ohio, football coach, 1992
 Gary Hogeboom, Central Michigan, football, 1994
 Fred Jacoby, MAC commissioner, 1990
 Bob James, MAC commissioner, 1989
 Ron Johnson, Eastern Michigan, football, 1988
 Dave Keilitz, Central Michigan, baseball, 2013
 Ted Kjolhede, Central Michigan, basketball, 1988
 Kim Knuth, Toledo, women's basketball, 2013
 Ken Kramer, Ball State, football, 1991
 Bill Lajoie, Western Michigan, baseball, 1991
 Jack Lambert, Kent State, football, 1988
 Frank Lauterbur, Toledo, football, 1990
 Mel Long, Toledo, football, 1992
 Charlier Maher, Western Michigan, baseball, 1989
 Bill Mallory, Miami/Northern Illinois, football, 2013
 Brad Maynard, Ball State, football, 2013
 Ray McCallum, Ball State, basketball, 1988
 Jack McLain, MAC football official, 1992
 Karen Michalak, Central Michigan, basketball / track and field / field hockey, 1992
 Gordon Minty, Eastern Michigan, track and field, 1994
 Steve Mix, Toledo, basketball, 1989
 Thurman Munson, Kent State, baseball, 1990
 Ira Murchinson, Western Michigan, track and field, 1990
 Don Nehlen, Bowling Green, football, 1994
 Manny Newsome, Western Michigan, basketball, 1988
 Bob Nichols, Toledo, basketball, 2012
 John Offerdahl, Western Michigan, football, 2013
 Bob Owchinko, Eastern Michigan, baseball, 1992
 Ara Parseghian, Miami, football, 1988
 Doyt Perry, Bowling Green, football, 1988
 John Pont, Miami, football player / coach, 1992
 John Pruis, Ball State, president, 1994
 Trevor Rees, Kent State, football, 1989
 David Reese, MAC commissioner, 1988
 George Rider, Miami, track and field, 1989
 William Rohr, Miami, basketball coach 1994
 Dan Roundfield, Central Michigan, basketball, 1990
 Bo Schembechler, Miami, football coach, 1991
 Mike Schmidt, Ohio, baseball, 2012
 Dick Shrider, Miami, basketball, 1990
 Christi Smith, Akron, track and field, 2013
 Jim Snyder, Ohio, basketball, 1991
 Shafer Suggs, Ball State, football, 1989
 Nate Thurmond, Bowling Green, basketball, 1989
 Gary Trent, Ohio, men's basketball, 2013
 Phil Villapiano, Bowling Green, football, 1992
 Bob Welch, Eastern Michigan, baseball, 1990
 Dave Wottle, Bowling Green, track and field, 1990
 Bob Wren, Ohio, baseball, 1989

Media
Broadcasts
A number of MAC sports, including football, men's and women's basketball, baseball, soccer, wrestling and volleyball, are telecast on Spectrum Sports (Ohio), replacing SportsTime Ohio and Fox Sports Ohio as the MAC TV partner. Along with Spectrum Sports, ESPN, as well as the American Sports Network, retain the "local and regional" syndication telecast rights to the MAC for football and basketball.

In 2000 ESPN began broadcasting MAC football games on Tuesdays and Wednesdays. The conference agreed to the unusual schedule to increase television ratings by not competing against other football. Fans nicknamed the midweek games MACtion'''. In 2014 the conference and ESPN agreed to a new contract for 13 years. Each school receives more than $800,000 annually, and plays most November games on weekday nights; 16 of 18 games in 2016 were not on Saturdays, for example. While MACtion decreases stadium attendance, games appear on an ESPN channel to a nationwide audience instead of a less-popular channel or streaming media.

Ball State produces its own comprehensive television package with Ball State Sports Link. Affiliate stations include WIPB in Muncie, WNDY in Indianapolis, WPTA in Fort Wayne, WHME in South Bend, WTVW in Evansville, WYIN in Merrillville and Comcast in Michigan. All Ball State Sports Link games are also broadcast on student radio station WCRD and on the Ball State Radio Network produced by WLBC-FM and Backyard Broadcasting.

NIU has multiple football and basketball games telecast by Comcast SportsNet Chicago. In addition, most NIU football and basketball games can be heard on WSCR-AM 670 "The Score" – Chicago's powerful 50,000-watt top-rated all-sports station, which reaches 38 states and Canada.

MAC Properties
MAC Properties (a division of ISP Sports) is the sponsorship arm of the Mid-American Conference, and handles all forms of sponsorship and advertising for the MAC which includes managing and growing its stable of official corporate partners. As of 2010, the MAC has five official corporate partners: FirstEnergy, Marathon, PNC Bank, AutoTrader.com and Cleveland Clinic Sports Health. There are approximately 20 other companies engaged as sponsors of the conference at the non-official level. MAC Properties also assists with the management of the conference's television and radio contracts, including those with ESPN Regional, FOX Sports Ohio and ESPN 850 WKNR among others.

See also
 List of American collegiate athletic stadiums and arenas

References

External links
 

 
Organizations based in Cleveland
Sports in the Midwestern United States
Sports organizations established in 1946
Articles which contain graphical timelines